Made In Japan is the third album by Japanese rock band Flower Travellin' Band, released in 1972.

Production
After meeting Lighthouse at the Expo '70 festival in Osaka, Flower Travellin' Band were invited to visit Canada. While there, the group recorded Made in Japan with Lighthouse keyboardist Paul Hoffert helping produce. Vocalist Joe Yamanaka later stated that the process was very easy, with everything flowing well.

Due to George Wada becoming ill with tuberculosis, Canadian drummer Paul DeLong plays on some tracks on this album. The lyrics were written by Yoko Nomura, the wife of the band's manager, who translated conversations she had with the group and their ideas into English. "Heaven and Hell" was written by Yamanaka in Japanese and she translated it. The song "Hiroshima" is a re-imagining of "Satori Part III" from their previous album Satori. The introductory first track is an advertisement for a concert at Stanley Park Stadium by Flower Travellin' Band, Emerson, Lake & Palmer, Bob Seger and Teegarden & Van Winkle, with a clip of "Lucky Man" playing in the background.

"Hiroshima", "Heaven and Hell" and "Aw Give Me Air" were covered by Cult of Personality, 9, and punk band Pulling Teeth respectively, for the 2000 Flower Travellin' Band Tribute album.

Reception

Both Mason Jones of Dusted magazine and Eduardo Rivadavia of Allmusic claimed that following Satori was a difficult task and that Made in Japan was "doomed to fall short of expectations," respectively. Both reviewers also cited the same three songs, "Kamikaze", "Hiroshima" and "Spasms", as the highlights and being on par with the band's best work. Although he felt it inconsistent, Rivadavia called the album "pretty darn good!" and gave it a 3.5 star rating out of 5.

Track listing

Personnel
Flower Travellin' Band
Joe Yamanaka – vocals
 Hideki Ishima – guitar, sitar
 Jun Kozuki – bass
 Joji Wada – drums
Additional musicians
 Paul DeLong – drums
Production and design
 Yoko Nomura – lyrics
 Flower Travellin' Band – arrangement
 Ikuzo Orita – producer
 Paul Hoffert – producer
 Yuya Uchida – producer
 Gilbert Kong – mixing
 Kiyoshi Sunamori – artwork
 Yoshio Niwano – artwork
 David Ohashi – photography
 Toyo Nakamura – liner notes
 John & Yoko Nomura – supervision

References

Flower Travellin' Band albums
1972 albums
Atlantic Records albums